Liberatia is a genus of flowering plants belonging to the family Acanthaceae.

It is native to Bolivia and Brazil.

The genus name of Liberatia is in honour of Liberato Joaquim Barroso (1900–1949), a Brazilian botanist and agronomist. 
It was first described and published in Bol. Mus. Nac. Rio de Janeiro, Bot. Vol.8 on page 21 in 1947.

Known species, according to Kew:
Liberatia boliviana 
Liberatia diandra

References

Acanthaceae
Acanthaceae genera
Plants described in 1947
Flora of Bolivia
Flora of Brazil